Hesperalbizia occidentalis (palo esopeta) is a species of plant in the family Fabaceae. As a native plant it is found only in Mexico, where it is endangered by deforestation. It has been introduced to Honduras.

Footnotes

References
 
  (2005): Hesperalbizia occidentalis. Version 10.01, November 2005. Retrieved 2008-MAR-30.

Mimosoids
Trees of Mexico
Endangered plants
Taxonomy articles created by Polbot
Taxobox binomials not recognized by IUCN